Hypericum russeggeri is a species of shrub in the genus Hypericum and is the type species of sect. Adenotrias.

References

russeggeri